Vili Lehdonvirta is Professor of Economic Sociology and Digital Social Research at the Oxford Internet Institute, University of Oxford.  He is also a senior research fellow of Jesus College, Oxford, an associate member of the Department of Sociology, Oxford and a former Fellow of the Alan Turing Institute, London. Lehdonvirta is an economic sociologist, whose research draws on theories and approaches from economic sociology, new institutional economics, labour sociology, and science and technology studies. His research focuses on digital technologies—such as apps, platforms, and marketplaces—are governed, how they shape the organisation of economic activities, and the resulting implications for workers, consumers, businesses, and policy.

Research 
Lehdonvirta is the principal investigator of iLabour, a major research project on online freelancing and the gig economy, funded by the European Research Council. He also leads research projects on online labour markets' effects in rural areas and crowd workers' skill development. His other recent research takes a critical look at Bitcoin and blockchain.  His previous research on virtual goods, virtual consumption and digital games is summarised in 'Virtual Economies: Design and Analysis", co-authored with Edward Castronova, and published by MIT Press.

Policy work 
Lehdonvirta has advised companies, policy makers, and international organisations in Europe, the United States and Japan.  He is a member of the European Commission's Expert Group on the Online Platform Economy, which supports the Commission in monitoring the evolution of the online platform economy for evidence-based and problem-focused policymaking and the High-Level Group on Digital Transmission and EU Labour markets, which provides analysis and advice to the Commission, and explores policy options.

Education 
Lehdonvirta holds a PhD in Economic Sociology from the University of Turku (2009) and a MSc from the Helsinki University of Technology (2005).  Previously he worked at the London School of Economics, the University of Tokyo, and the Helsinki Institute for Information Technology. Before his academic career, he worked as a game programmer for Jippii Mobile Entertainment Oy.

Published works

Academic articles 

 Lehdonvirta, V. (2018) "Flexibility in the Gig Economy: Managing Time on Three Online Piecework Platforms." New Technology, Work & Employment: 33 (1) 13-29.
 Ogembo, D. and Lehdonvirta, V. (2020) "Taxing Earnings from the Platform Economy: An EU Digital Single Window for Income Data?" British Tax Review [2020](1): 82-101.
 Braesemann, F., Lehdonvirta, V., and Kässi, O. (2020) "ICTs and the Urban-Rural Divide: Can Online Labour Platforms Bridge the Gap?" Information, Communication & Society. 
 Vidan, G. and Lehdonvirta, V. (2019) "Mine the gap: Bitcoin and the maintenance of trustlessness." New Media & Society 21(1): 42-59.
 Lehdonvirta, V., Kässi, O., Hjorth, I., Barnard, H., and Graham, M. (2019) "The Global Platform Economy: A New Offshoring Institution Enabling Emerging-Economy Microproviders." Journal of Management 45(2): 567-599.
 Lee, S., and Lehdonvirta, V., (2020) "New Digital Safety Net or Just More ‘Friendfunding’? Institutional Analysis of Medical Crowdfunding in the United States." Information, Communication & Society.
 Wood, A. J. and Lehdonvirta, V. (2021) "Antagonism beyond employment: how the ‘subordinated agency’ of labour platforms generates conflict in the remote gig economy." Socio-Economic Review.
 Kässi, O, and V Lehdonvirta. (2022) "Do Microcredentials Help New Workers Enter the Market? Evidence from an Online Labor Platform." Journal of Human Resources.

Books 

 Cloud Empires: How digital platforms are overtaking the state and how we can regain control. (2022) ISBN 9780262047227
 Virtual Economies: Design and Analysis. (2014), With Edward Castronova ISBN 0262535068

References 

Living people
Economic sociologists
Finnish sociologists
People associated with the University of Oxford
Year of birth missing (living people)
Finnish expatriates in England
European Research Council grantees